The Nigerian National Assembly delegation from Ondo comprises three Senators representing Ondo North, Ondo South, Ondo Central and eight Representatives Akoko South East/South West, Irele/Okitipupa, Ile-Oluji Okeigbo/Odigbo, Akoko North East/north West, Idanre/Ifedore, Ondo East/ West, Akure North /South, and Owo/Ose.

Fourth Republic

9th Assembly (2019-2023)

8th Assembly (2015-2019)

7th Assembly (2011-2015)

6th Assembly (2007-2011)

5th Assembly (2007 - 2011)

N  (AD)

4th Assembly (1999 - 2003)

References
Official Website - National Assembly House of Representatives (Ondo State)
 Senator List

Ondo State
National Assembly (Nigeria) delegations by state